An intense low-pressure system produced widespread impacts across the United States in early March 2023. Additionally, an outbreak of 33 tornadoes affected 12 states from the Southern United States to the Great Lakes. In all, the storm system killed 13 people due to flooding and strong winds. At least 17 other people were injured.

Meteorological synopsis

March 1
While confidence for a widespread severe weather outbreak increased for March 2, an enhanced risk for severe weather, including the possibility for a few strong/EF2+ tornadoes, was issued for March 1.  A large capping inversion, placed along northern Louisiana, was expected to contain the atmosphere from iniciating convective activity, but the presense of moisture, daytime heating in the area, and steep mid-level lapse rates, made the environment favorable for severe weather, including the possibility for supercells capable of all hazards. Given the favorable parameters in place, the Storm Prediction Center (SPC) issued a large corridor, extending from extreme northeastern Texas, most of central Arkansas, northwestern Mississippi, and southwestern Tennessee, were the highest probabilities for tornadoes were located. A slight risk, lined with a 5% risk for tornadoes, was issued around the main area of concern, and extended into central Tennessee, and northern Alabama. A large, 30% risk for strong, damaging wind gusts was also placed along central and eastern portions of Arkansas, extending into northwest Mississippi and southwest Tennessee, as was a hatched corridor for very large hail was also introduced for this corridor.

March 2

As a large, widespread, and damaging storm complex event was occurring throughout the Great Plains, which unleashed powerful damaging winds and tornadoes across Texas, Oklahoma, and Kansas, the SPC highlighted a potential area for the risk of severe weather in the following days, with the main, 30% area for severe weather centered around eastern Texas, northern Louisiana, southern Arkansas, middle portions of Mississippi, and western Alabama, as conditions were expected to be very favorable for the development of thunderstorms capable of all severe weather hazards.

After introducing a massive level 3/enhanced risk for March 2 on February 28, which now included portions of southeastern Oklahoma, the SPC upped the threat to a level 4/moderate risk, throughout a corridor centered along the Ark-La-Tex region, clipping into extreme southeastern Oklahoma, on March 1. Throughout the risk area, the environmentally favorable conditions for severe weather were set in motion due to the presence of abundant moisture, instability that was expected ahead of a cold front starting from north-central Texas, and intense wind shear prevalent across the entire region. With this setup, a linear cluster of discrete supercell thunderstorms was expected to develop, and given the favorable wind and instability patterns, a 15%, hatched risk for strong/EF2+ tornadoes was placed along the moderate risk area, while a large, surrounding 10% hatched risk for strong tornadoes was placed and extended into central portions of Arkansas, and all the way into northwestern Mississippi. At the 1630 UTC update on March 2, however, the 15% hatched area was removed due to lingering uncertainty about the timing of the most favorable wind shear for tornadoes versus the convective mode of the ongoing storms. Despite this, a moderate risk remained due to a 45% hatched risk for damaging winds and 45% hatched area for large hail that had also been issued.

March 3

Confirmed tornadoes

March 1 event

March 2 event

March 3 event

Impact

On March 1, the snowstorm in Arizona led to many pileups, and several roads such as I-40, I-17, and US 93 closed. Later that day, hail fell in north Texas, some of which were up to half-dollar size. Hail fell in Dilley, Texas, causing damage to windows and cars, as well as a severe thunderstorm warning for softball sized hail in Pearsall, Texas. On March 3, the storm led to the lowest pressure on record in Louisville and Bowling Green, Kentucky. Later that day, snow led to many snow emergencies in the Albany, New York metropolitan area and near Pittsfield, Massachusetts.

See also
Weather of 2023
List of North American tornadoes and tornado outbreaks

Notes

References 

2023 meteorology
F2 tornadoes
2023 in Alabama
Tornadoes in Alabama
2023 natural disasters in the United States
2023 in Arkansas
Tornadoes in Arkansas
2023 in Texas
Tornadoes in Texas
2023 in Oklahoma
Tornadoes in Oklahoma
2023 in Ohio
Tornadoes in Ohio
2023 in Indiana
Tornadoes in Indiana
2023 in Tennessee
Tornadoes in Tennessee
2023 in Louisiana
Tornadoes in Louisiana
2023 in Mississippi
Tornadoes in Mississippi
2023 in Georgia (U.S. state)
Tornadoes in Georgia (U.S. state)